Les Alleuds may refer to the following places in France:

 Les Alleuds, Maine-et-Loire, a commune in the Maine-et-Loire department
 Les Alleuds, Deux-Sèvres, a commune in the Deux-Sèvres department